SIC Caras is a Portuguese digital cable and satellite television channel owned by SIC. It features talk-shows, biographies and documentaries programming related to celebrities and royalty, reflecting Caras magazine content. Passadeira Vermelha (Red Carpet), is the primetime and flagship show, a SIC Caras original, while almost half of programming is imported, ranging from celebrity-related documentaries to U.S. talk shows (Martha Stewart, Miss pageants, Victoria's Secret). In Portugal, initially the channel had an exclusivity contract with NOS.

In June 2014, it started broadcasting to ZAP in Angola and Mozambique.

References 

Television stations in Portugal
Television channels and stations established in 2013
2013 establishments in Portugal